Duboka may refer to several places:
 Duboka (Vrbanja), left tributary of Vrbanja river, Kotor Varoš (Bosnia)
 Duboka (Vrbas), right tributary of Vrbas river, Bugojno (Bosnia)
 Duboka (Jagodina), a village in Jagodina, Serbia
 Duboka (Kučevo), a village in Kučevo, Serbia